Springtime in the Sierras is a 1947 American Trucolor Western film directed by William Witney and starring Roy Rogers, Trigger, Jane Frazee and Andy Devine.

The film is now in the public domain.

Plot
Singing cowboy Roy Rogers and the Sons of the Pioneers are bringing horses to sell to Jean Loring's (Stephanie Bachelor) ranch. They come across an orphaned faun and decide to bring it to Captain Foster, a retired army captain who gave up the army to look after orphaned animals. Cap has the faun's mortally wounded mother who has been a victim of a gang of poachers shooting out of season that have been nearly wiping out the local animal population. Cap explains that the gang is well organised and sells their meat throughout the nation.

Cap captures the gang of vicious poachers who wear surplus USMC camouflage uniforms and use high powered rifles with sound suppressors. The leader of the poachers gets the drop on Cap and murders him, making his death seem like an accident. Roy, his photographer sidekick Cookie (Andy Devine) and rancher Taffy Baker (Jane Frazee) bring justice to the West and the Animal Kingdom.

Cast
 Roy Rogers as Roy Rogers
 Trigger as Roy's Horse
 Jane Frazee as Taffy Baker
 Andy Devine as Cookie Bullfincher
 Stephanie Bachelor as Jean Loring
 Harold Landon as Bert Baker
 Harry Cheshire as Cap Foster
 Roy Barcroft as Matt Wilkes
 Chester Conklin Old Timer
 Hank Patterson Old Timer
 Whitey Christy as Henchman
 Pascale Perry as Henchman
 Bob Nolan as Musician
 Sons of the Pioneers as Musicians, ranch hands

Soundtrack
Roy Rogers, Jane Frazee and the Sons of the Pioneers - "Springtime in the Sierras" (Written by Jack Elliott)
Roy Rogers and Andy Devine - "Oh, What a Picture" (Written by Jack Elliott)
Roy Rogers and Jane Frazee - "Pedro from Acapulco" (Written by Jack Elliott)
Roy Rogers and the Sons of the Pioneers - "A Cowboy Has to Sing" (Written by Bob Nolan)
Andy Devine and the Sons of the Pioneers - "What Are We Gonna Do Then?" (Written by Tim Spencer)
Roy Rogers and the Sons of the Pioneers - "The Quilting Party (When I Saw Sweet Nellie Home)" (1859) (Lyrics by John Fletcher, music by Frances Kyle)

Release
June 26, 2011 Film Chest released Springtime in the Sierras, rarely ever seen in color, restored from the original, rare, 16mm archive print and digitally re-mastered presented in full frame with an aspect ratio of 4 x 3 and mono sound. Bonus feature: The Chevy Show Easter special (April 2, 1961) featuring Roy Rogers and Dale Evans with special guests Charley Weaver, Eddie Arnold, George Maharis, and The Limeliters.

See also
 Public domain film
 List of American films of 1947
 List of films in the public domain in the United States

References

External links

 Film Chest Media Group Press Release
Review at Cinema Sentries
Springtime in the Sierras on Amazon

1947 films
1947 Western (genre) films
Films scored by Ernest Gold
Republic Pictures films
American Western (genre) films
Trucolor films
Films directed by William Witney
1940s English-language films
1940s American films